The Quebec Derby was a Canadian Thoroughbred horse race held annually between 1961 and 1975 at Blue Bonnets Raceway in Montreal, Canada. A race for three-year-olds on dirt, it was run over a distance of 1⅛ miles (9 furlongs or 1,811 metres).

The Blue Bonnets Raceway held only harness racing events at the time when prominent Canadian horseman Jean-Louis Levesque purchased the track in 1959. He brought Thoroughbred horse racing there on a seasonal basis. The Quebec Derby was the track's premier annual event for Thoroughbreds and Levesque himself would win the race five times with Royal Maple (1963), Pierlou (1964), Fanfreluche (1970), La Prevoyante (1973), and L'Enjoleur (1975).

Trainer Ted Mann, a 1982 Canadian Horse Racing Hall of Fame inductee, trained the first two winners of the Quebec Derby.

Winners of the Quebec Derby
1975 - L'Enjoleur
1974 - Norland
1973 - La Prevoyante
1972 - Gentleman Conn
1971 - Green Belt
1970 - Fanfreluche
1969 - Sharp-Eyed Quillo
1968 - Phelodie
1967 - More of Mort
1966 - Bye and Near
1965 - Good Old Mort
1964 - Pierlou
1963 - Royal Maple
1962 - Fire Queen
1961 - Edgor's Lane

References
 The Quebec Derby at Pedigree Query

Horse races in Canada
Flat horse races for three-year-olds
Discontinued horse races
Sport in Montreal
Recurring sporting events established in 1961
Recurring sporting events disestablished in 1975
1961 establishments in Quebec
1975 disestablishments in Quebec